Yellow is a 2012 American drama film directed by Nick Cassavetes and written by Cassavetes and Heather Wahlquist. The film stars Wahlquist, Riley Keough, Sienna Miller, David Morse, Ray Liotta, Melanie Griffith and Lucy Punch.

Yellow premiered at the 2012 Toronto International Film Festival, and had a limited release in the United States on August 29, 2014.

Plot
Mary Holmes is an elementary school teacher living in a hallucinatory world and consuming twenty Vicodin a day. One day she is fired from her job after being caught having sex with one of the parents on Parent Teacher Day. She leaves Los Angeles and returns to her native Oklahoma, and tries to cope with numerous family traumas, including a past incestuous relationship with her half-brother.

Cast
Heather Wahlquist as Mary Holmes
Riley Keough as Young Amanda
Sienna Miller as Xanne
David Morse as Psychologist
Ray Liotta as Afai
Melanie Griffith as Patsy
Lucy Punch as Amanda
Max Thieriot as Young Nowell
Elizabeth Daily as Aunt Netty
Daveigh Chase as Young Mary
Gena Rowlands as Mimi
Cassandra Jean as Becky
Brendan Sexton III as Nowell
Jordan Flash Rose as Chad 
Gary Stretch as Jimmy Carpenito Snr
Onata Aprile as Linda
Bella Dayne as Ashley
Malea Rose as Zadora 
Nancy De Mayo as Miss Withrow
Tonya Cornelisse as Starla

Production
80 percent of the film was shot in Oklahoma. Locations included Oklahoma City University and John Marshall High School in Oklahoma City, and a grocery store in Shawnee. The remainder of filming took place in Los Angeles.

Release
The film premiered at the Toronto International Film Festival on September 8, 2012.

The film received a limited theatrical release in the United States by its production company, Medient Studios, on August 29, 2014.

Reception
The film was awarded "Best Film" at the Catalina Film Festival on September 22, 2013.

References

External links

2012 films
2012 drama films
2010s American films
2010s English-language films
American drama films
Films about drugs
Films about educators
Films directed by Nick Cassavetes
Films scored by Aaron Zigman
Films set in Los Angeles
Films set in Oklahoma
Films shot in Los Angeles
Films shot in Oklahoma City
Incest in film